Christina Surer (born 26 March 1974 in Basel) is a Swiss race car driver. She spent several years in go-karts before participating in the Ford Superseries (2002), Alfa 147 Cup (2002) and the Ford Fiesta Cup (2003).  She has participated in two 24 Hours Nürburgring races (2004, 2005) and since 2004, has been racing in the Seat Leon Supercopa.  

Surer has modelled for Playboy and was married to Formula One driver Marc Surer from 1997 to 2000. In 2012, she became engaged to DTM racer Martin Tomczyk. Aside from racing and modelling, she hosts television programs.

References

External links

1974 births
Living people
Sportspeople from Basel-Stadt
Racing drivers' wives and girlfriends
Swiss racing drivers
Swiss female racing drivers